Tunley may refer to:

 Tunley (surname)
 Tunley, Somerset, in Camerton
 Tunley, Gloucestershire, in Oakridge
 Tunley Camp, an Iron Age hill fort in Camerton, Somerset, England